Janno Põldma (born 7 November 1950 in Tallinn) is an Estonian film director and children's writer.

Since 1973 he has worked in Tallinnfilm Studio.

He has filmed about 20 animated films, mostly Priit Pärn's films.

Works

Films
 Tom and Fluffy
 The Boy Who Did Not Want To Be an Actor
 Ladybirds' Christmas
 Lotte from Gadgetville
 Lotte As a Detective
 Lotte and the Moonstone Secret
 Lotte and the Lost Dragons

Children's books
 1985: "Judo Boys"
 Ladybirds' Christmas
 Lotte and the Moonstone Secret
 The Lotte ABC Book (with Heiki Ernits)

References

Living people
1950 births
Estonian film directors
Estonian animated film directors
Estonian children's writers
Estonian male writers
20th-century Estonian writers
21st-century Estonian writers
Tallinn University alumni
Writers from Tallinn
People from Tallinn